Seasons and Regions Seafood Grill is a seafood restaurant in Portland, Oregon, United States.

Description
Seasons and Regions Seafood Grill is a seafood restaurant in southwest Portland's Multnomah neighborhood. The menu includes cioppino, dover sole parmesan, and mustard-and-dill steelhead trout.

History
The restaurant is owned by chef Greg Schwab, who hosts an annual tomato plant sale in the parking lot. In 2020, the restaurant was featured on season 31 of the Food Network's Diners, Drive-Ins and Dives. In 2021, during the COVID-19 pandemic, Seasons and Regions launched an online market with fish, smoked seafood, and Dungeness and artichoke dip, among other products. The restaurant operated via delivery and takeout service during the pandemic, at times.

Reception
In 2015, readers of The Oregonian decided the restaurant offered one of the city's five best happy hours. The restaurant was included in KGW's 2017 list of "5 top spots for seafood in Portland" and Yelp's 2019 list of "Top 100 Places for Brunch". Jenni Moore included Seasons and Regions in Eater Portlands 2021 list of "12 Stellar Portland Seafood Restaurants".

See also

 List of Diners, Drive-Ins and Dives episodes
 List of seafood restaurants

References

External links
 
 Seasons & Regions Seafood Grill at the Food Network
 Seasons & Regions at Zomato

Multnomah, Portland, Oregon
Seafood restaurants in Portland, Oregon
Year of establishment missing